Sirdaryo (Syrdaryinsky) is a town in Sughd Region, northern Tajikistan. It is part of the city of Guliston.

References

Populated places in Sughd Region